The Eastland Judges were a West Texas League baseball team based in Eastland, Texas, United States that played in 1920. Managed by James Maloney, they featured one major league baseball player: Joe Bratcher.

They are the only professional team to ever come out of Eastland, Texas.

References

Baseball teams established in 1920
Defunct minor league baseball teams
Defunct baseball teams in Texas
Baseball teams disestablished in 1920
1920 establishments in Texas
1920 disestablishments in Texas
Eastland County, Texas